The Bletchley Flyover was originally a reinforced concrete railway viaduct that carried the former Varsity line between  and  over the West Coast Main Line (WCML) at Bletchley railway station in Milton Keynes, England. It was retained but largely unused when the line closed until it was demolished in late 2020 and early 2021. During 2021, the East West Rail Alliance rebuilt the flyover and the route was in use by engineering trains by early 2022.

Construction
The original structure was composed of 37 concrete spans, resting on concrete piers. Most of the spans are beam-shaped; two are double-length arches. Electrification pads were provided when the flyover was first built, despite there being no plans to electrify the line.

History
In 1959, the Bletchley Flyover was opened to carry the Varsity line over the West Coast Main Line (WCML) as part of the British Rail Modernisation Plan. The plan proposed to develop the Varsity Line as a freight link from the East Coast ports to South Wales, capable of handling up to 2,400 wagons of coal class traffic and empties daily. However, following British Railways deciding not to proceed with the Swanbourne sidings plan, the line saw little use, with most freight traffic taking other routes.

The Varsity line closed to passengers on 1 January 1968; it remained open to goods traffic until October 1993, when the bridge was mothballed. The flyover was returned to use in 2006 along with a mile of track west of Bletchley to a loop at the Newton Longville Brickworks landfill site.

2020/2021 rebuild
As part of the East West Rail project that will reopen the OxfordCambridge route, work to replace 14 of the spans began in April 2020. Sections beside and over the WCML were removed in April and May. The arches crossing Buckingham Road (on the east side of WCML) started being removed on 5 July 2020. "The final span was lifted out by crane in October and the last of the supporting piers and pillars were removed over the weekend of 9-10 January 2021". At the early May 2021 holiday, 103 concrete girders were lifted into place to provide the bridge deck over the main line. 

During summer 2021, a new structure was built for use by East West Rail, in the form of a box tunnel around the WCML; by February 2022,  of track had been installed over the new flyover, enabling engineering trains to reach the eastern end of the construction site.

The renovation project includes a plan to construct high level platforms for Bletchley station, just after the eastern end of the flyover. These platforms will serve East West Rail (only).

References

External links

 

Bletchley
Bridges completed in 1959
Buildings and structures in Milton Keynes
Concrete bridges in the United Kingdom
Rail transport in Milton Keynes
Railway bridges in Buckinghamshire
1959 establishments in England
East West Rail